Angel Wars is an animated action adventure series from TeleStory TOONS and EMI CMG and more recently Twentieth Century Fox. Since its introduction in late 2004, the series has presented Christian-based storylines through 3D animation provided by the LA based Backyard Digital Studios.

Officially called "Angel Wars Guardian Force", this CGI movie series is a basic underline of good versus evil. The movie is intended for viewers aged six and older. The protagonists are Biblical and fictional angels.

The series is a departure from the traditional version of angels such as envisioned by Gustave Dore; the almost mech-armoured angels in this series are more futuristic with fantastical chariot vehicles and glowing weaponry.

The Guardian Force, headed by the biblical archangel Michael, are briefed by the unseen Maker, aboard an airship called The Seven. They depart by spreading their wings and flying down to Earth where they battle demonic fallen angels that seek to corrupt humanity. The student angels (Anawim) use wingboards until they earn their wings. The angels and demons (Morg) are invisible to the human eye as they exist on a spiritual plane, unless they take human form. However, the angels can affect the physical world in order to miraculously save humans from danger.

DVDs

Angel Wars Episode 1
"About Face" - Eli and Kira, two junior members of the Guardian Force must grow up in a hurry when their first mission to earth takes a detour, pitting them against Morg, a deadly but long forgotten foe. In a race against time, the Guardians must uncover the source of Morg's power, defeat his crafty minions, and stop the ruin of a mortal life, all while learning to work together.
Video: Sanctus Real - "Everything About You"
Falling Up - "Broken Heart"
Kutless - "Not What You See"
Songs: Sanctus Real - "Alone"
Newsboys - "Entertaining Angels"
dc Talk - "Supernatural"
Release date: October 28, 2004
DVD run time: 60 min.
Episode run time: 33 min.

Angel Wars Episode 2
"Over the Moon" - With each of the Guardians engaged on their assignments, Morg moves quickly to his hideaway base where he prepares to unleash a devastating blow against humankind with a missile. Drawn together by providence, the Guardian Force must uncover the secrets of their old foe and stop him before the earth is changed forever.
Video: TobyMac - "Gone"
4th Avenue Jones - "My Stereo"
GRITS - "Hitting Curves"
Release date: August 30, 2005
DVD run time: 108 min.
Episode run time: 38 min.
How to draw Angel Wars
Release date: November 22, 2005
DVD run time: 120 min.

Angel Wars Episode 3
"Grace and Glory" - With his angel hostage in tow, the archangel Michael on his tail, and a symbiotic stone taking control of his body, the demon Morg flees to the underworld where he quickly establishes a new base of operations. Feeding off the demon's pride, the symbiont stone slowly transforms Morg into an all-consuming beast with the power to threaten both Heaven and Earth. Facing impossible odds, it's up to Michael and the Guardian Force to prove the old Proverb true: that pride comes before the fall.
Video: Hawk Nelson - "The One Thing I Have Left"
Sanctus Real - "I'm Not Alright"
Kutless - "Shut Me Out"
Songs: Sanctus Real - "The Face of Love"
Release date: September 26, 2006
Episode run time: 33 min.

Angel Wars Episode 4
"The Messengers" - 5 stories in One DVD:
"Some Sound Advice" - When Eli says that learning music is a waste of time, Paladin tells him the story of how he once used music to save the day and how that feat earned him his wings.
"A Bone To Pick" - An elderly demon resurrects his brutish son to rule in his stead, but he instead goes on a rampage that Eli and Kira must put a stop to.
"Be Careful What You Wish For" - Eli finally gains his "wings", but they come at a huge cost.
"Stick Together" - After an argument splits them up, Eli and Kira discover a hive of demonic insects.
"Return to Sender" - Swift and the Messenger Archangel Ramuel are captured by demons and it's up to Eli, Kira, and Ramuel's unsure protege Cameron to save the day by delivering a crucial message before time runs out.
DVD run time: 89 min.

Characters

Other
Distributor Cactus Game Design cross-promoted the series with an Angel Wars-themed expansion to its Redemption CCG card game in 2004, after the movie was released. The expansion featured 150 cards, which used artwork from the series for the illustrations found on the cards.
Episode 4, "The Messengers" introduces a new class of lightning fast messenger angels.
Episodes 4-6 are being distributed exclusively by Twentieth Century Fox and are slated for release in spring 2009.[source]
There is a comic and graphic novel in pre-production as well.
Angel Wars: Soul Quest was released 2001. The idea of Angel Wars was laid out but pulled into a lower age group. There was only one episode released "Soul Quest" on VHS, which had a trailer for a second episode said to be in development, and to be released in 2002. It was abandoned in favor of developing the Guardian Force series.
The Switchfoot song "Dare You to Move" and the Newsboys song "Entertaining Angels" appear in Episode 1. Sanctus Real's "The Face of Love" appears in Episode 3. There are no songs in Episode 2.
The first line of action figures were announced by Chris Waters in late 2006 for Easter of 2007. The line includes the Archangel Michael and the fallen angel Morgan. The 6.5" posable figures  include removable helmets, wings, and swords. The collectables were managed by Near Point Toys.

See also
 List of films about angels

References

External links
 

American computer-animated films
Christian animation
Films about angels